Chinese medicine and public health may refer to:
Traditional Chinese medicine
Traditional Chinese medicine and public health 
Medicine in China
Health in China